Robert Edward "Bob" Momsen (May 28, 1929 - May 25, 2010) was an American football player.  He was a first-team All-American at Ohio State in 1950.

Early years
Momsen was born in Toledo, Ohio, in 1929. He was the son of Rose and Anton Momsen, Sr., and the younger brother of Tony Momsen.  Momsen and his brother Tony both attended Libbey High School.

Ohio State
Brother Tony attended the University of Michigan, while Bob attended Ohio State University.  Both brothers played college football and became adversaries in the Michigan–Ohio State football rivalry.  Bob Momsen played at the guard and linebacker positions for the Ohio State Buckeyes while brother Tony played at the center and linebacker positions for the Michigan Wolverines.  Bob Momsen was selected by the Football Writers Association of America as a first-team defensive player and on their 1950 College Football All-America Team.

The Momsen brothers are most remembered for their role in the famed 1950 Snow Bowl game between Michigan and Ohio State.  The game was played in a blizzard, with weather conditions so inclement that Michigan punted on first down for its first two plays from scrimmage, after concluding that the best strategy was to keep the slick ball on the other side of the field and in the hands of Ohio State.   The Buckeyes scored when Vic Janowicz kicked a field goal after Bob Momsen recovered a blocked Wolverine kick.  With 47 seconds remaining in the first half, Tony Momsen blocked a Janowicz punt and fell on the ball in the end zone for a touchdown.  The Wolverines won by a final score of 9–3.  Bob Momsen later recalled, "Two brothers got more publicity for playing in a terrible football game than anyone ever deserves."

Professional football
Both Momsen brothers went on to play in the National Football League (NFL).  Bob was drafted by the Detroit Lions with the 80th pick in the 1951 NFL Draft and played for the Lions during the 1951 NFL season. He also played for the San Francisco 49ers in the 1952 NFL season.

Later years
After retiring as a professional football player, Momsen coached football at Northland College in Ashland, Wisconsin, before returning to Toledo in 1956.  He coached high school football for 25 years at Libbey, Waite, and Macomber High Schools in Toledo.  He was inducted into the Ohio State Athletics Hall of Fame  in 2005. Momsen died in Toledo in 2010 at age 80.

References 

1929 births
2010 deaths
Ohio State Buckeyes football players
Detroit Lions players
San Francisco 49ers players
American football linebackers
Players of American football from Ohio
Sportspeople from Toledo, Ohio